The International Helsinki Federation for Human Rights (IHF) was a self-governing group of non-governmental organizations that acted to protect human rights throughout Europe, North America and Central Asia. A specific primary goal was to monitor compliance with the human rights provisions of the Helsinki Final Act and its follow-up documents.

History
It was founded in 1982, inspired in part by an appeal from Dr. Andrei Sakharov for the creation of a "unified international committee to defend all Helsinki Watch Group members", and also to co-ordinate their work. The IHF was founded in response, both to provide an organization which the various independent Helsinki committees could use to support each other, as well as provide an international body to strengthen their work.

The original members were the independent Helsinki committees of Austria, Belgium, Canada, France, Netherlands, Norway, Sweden and the United States; an international secretariat was established in Vienna. The secretariat supported and provided liaison member Helsinki committees and associated human rights groups, and represented them at the international political level. At the time IHF was dissolved, it had forty-six member committees.

The IHF also had direct links with individuals and groups supporting human rights in countries where no Helsinki committees exist. In addition to gathering and analyzing information on human rights conditions in OSCE countries, the IHF acted as a clearing house for this information, disseminating it to governments, inter-governmental organizations, the press and the public at large.

Karl zu Schwarzenberg served as chairman of the federation from 1984 to 1991. The International Helsinki Federation for Human Rights was awarded the European Human Rights Prize in 1989, jointly with Lech Wałęsa. 

In January 2008, an Austrian court convicted the IHF's former financial manager, the Austrian Rainer Tannenberger, of the embezzlement of  €1.2 million. Tannenberger was sentenced to three years in prison, with two of them suspended.  The IHF's resulting insolvency had driven it to file for bankruptcy in Austria, its country of registration, and to be dissolved on 27 November 2007. An IHR accountant was sentenced to three years for embezzling $1.8 million from the Helsinki Federation for Human Rights to support his mistress. He channeled money from human rights projects to his bank account, and used the organization's ATM card for personal purposes which went unnoticed for six years.

After its closure, IHF's complete archives were transferred to the Blinken Open Society Archives which acts as the organisation's official repository.

See also
 Moscow Helsinki Group
 Charter 77
 Helsinki Watch
 Helsinki Committee for Human Rights
 Helsinki Foundation for Human Rights

References

External links
International Helsinki Federation for Human Rights – close down notice

Defunct international non-governmental organizations
International human rights organizations
Organizations established in 1982